Kirzner is a surname. Notable people with the surname include:

Israel Kirzner (born 1930), British-born American economist
Julian Kirzner (born 1976), Australian rules footballer
Adrián Kirzner Schwartz (born 1968), Argentine actor and media producer better known as Adrián Suar

See also
Kirner